Alejo Peralta y Díaz Cevallos (5 May 1916 in Puebla - 8 April 1997 in Mexico City) founded the Mexico City Tigers baseball team (now known as the Tigres de Quintana Roo) in 1955. He was a well-known businessman at the time.

References

Baseball executives
Mexican Baseball Hall of Fame inductees
1916 births
1997 deaths